Yad Hanadiv (The Rothschild Foundation) is a Rothschild family philanthropic foundation in Israel.

Goals and objectives
Yad Hanadiv defines its mission as: Dedicated to creating resources for advancing Israel as a healthy, vibrant, democratic society, committed to Jewish values and equal opportunity for the benefit of all its inhabitants, carrying forward the philanthropic tradition of the Rothschild family.

Yad Hanadiv's grantmaking is focused on the areas of education, environment, academic excellence, and Arab community. 
It funds and operates Ramat Hanadiv Memorial Gardens and Nature Park and is participating in renewal of the National Library of Israel, including the construction of a state-of-the-art, 21st-century National Library for the State of Israel. 
Initiatives include advancing precision medicine in Israel, promoting humanities research and teaching, upgrading teachers' professional development, Arab employment, advancing excellent Arab students in Science and Technology, advancing marine ecosystems and river rehabilitation.

History
Yad Hanadiv memorializes Baron Edmond James de Rothschild ("Hanadiv Hayadua" - “The well-known benefactor”), and continues the spirit and legacy of the Rothschild Family. The Foundation was established in its current form in 1958. Its first chairperson was Dorothy de Rothschild, who served in this position until 1988. In 1989 Lord Rothschild (Jacob) was appointed chair. In 2018 the Hon. Hannah Rothschild assumed the position of chair and Lord Rothschild became Yad Hanadiv's president. Ariel Weiss is the Foundation's Chief Executive.

Projects

Past projects
Yad Hanadiv was instrumental in the construction of the Knesset building and The Supreme Court of Israel, and in the establishment of Israeli Educational Television, The Open University, The Centre for Educational Technology, Centre for Science Education (HEMDA), MANOF Youth Village, The Jerusalem Music Centre at Mishkenot Sha’ananim, The Institute for Advanced Studies, The Water Research Institute at the Technion, The Environment and Health Fund, The Israel Institute for School Leadership (Avney Rosha), the GuideStar Israel database of non-profit organizations, and other institutions.

Ongoing projects
 The Academic Excellence Programme aims to help world-class academic research to thrive in Israel.
 The Environment Programme at Yad Hanadiv was established just over a decade ago with the aim of improving the resilience and health of Israel's natural, agricultural and urban ecosystems.
 Arab Community - Yad Hanadiv established its programme area dedicated to advancing the Arab Community over a decade ago, in keeping with its mission to work towards equal opportunity for the benefit of all Israel's inhabitants.
 The Education Programme is working to upgrade in-school professional development of Israeli teachers – to influence the quality of teaching, and ultimately of student learning at scale. 
 National Library of Israel - Yad Hanadiv, in cooperation with the Government of Israel, is supporting renewal of the National Library that will enable it to fulfil its 21st century mission: openness and accessibility of the Library holdings to communities of scholars and the public at the Library's new home and via the Internet.
 Ramat Hanadiv - Yad Hanadiv funds and operates Ramat Hanadiv Memorial Gardens and Nature Park and has entered into a partnership with the Government and the Library in a project of renewal of the National Library of Israel.

Prizes and fellowships
The Foundation grants prizes and fellowships through several programmes: 
 The Rothschild Prizes, awarded biennially in recognition of original and outstanding published work in the following disciplines: Mathematics/Computer Sciences and Engineering, Chemical Sciences and Physical Sciences, Life Sciences, Jewish Studies, Humanities and Social Sciences.
 The Rothschild Fellowship for postdoctoral students who seek to continue studies outside of Israel.
 The Rothschild Prize in Education in Memory of Max Rowe. 
 Since 2012 The Michael Bruno Memorial Award for researchers under the age of 50, who have been recognized as having potential for breakthroughs in their field has been operated by the Israel Institute for Advanced Studies at The Hebrew University of Jerusalem.

The National Library of Israel 
Yad Hanadiv's support for the National Library renewal includes funding, together with the Gottesman Family, of construction of a new National Library building on a triangular plot facing the Knesset building, which was donated by the Israeli government. The new library building is being designed by the Swiss firm of Herzog & de Meuron.

References

External links
 Official Website

Charities based in Israel

1958 establishments in Israel